"Se Thelo Me Trela" is a CD single by the popular Greek singer Kelly Kelekidou, released in November 2007 by Sony BMG. The golden CD single contains three songs from Kelekidou's third studio album Makria Sou Den Iparho, which was released in April 2008. The song's title, "Se Thelo Me Trela", is a Greek translation of a popular 2006 Arabic hit titled "Ya Tabtab Wa Dallaa" by the Lebanese singer, Nancy Ajram.

Track listing
 "Se Vgazo Akiro"
 "Se Thelo Me Trela"
 "Gia Kapia Kseni"

Charts

References

2007 singles
Greek-language songs
Kelly Kelekidou songs
2007 songs
Sony BMG singles